The Samsung Galaxy Tab A7 is Android tablet computer mid-range designed by Samsung Electronics. It consists of two variants, Samsung Galaxy Tab A7 2020 and Samsung Galaxy Tab A7 Lite.

History
The Samsung Galaxy Tab A7 Lite was a smaller, more compact and affordable version.

Features
The Samsung Galaxy Tab A7 features a  IPS screen (a larger screen than the previous Galaxy Tab A), a 7040 mAh battery, and facial recognition. The SM-T505 and SM-T225 have LTE mobile network connectivity, unlike the SM-T500 and SM-T220.

The A7 features 3 finishes: Dark Grey, Silver, and Gold. Dolby Atmos is implemented into the quad-speaker set-up. The tablet also has up to 329 nits of brightness, split-screen capabilities and Picture in Picture support. The A7 can upgrade to Android 12 from the previous Android 10. The A7 has an 8MP AF rear camera and a 5MP front-facing camera with an ambient light sensor.

Hardware
Samsung Galaxy Tab A7 LTE Uses IPS screen with 1200x2000 pixels resolution, supports LTE connection, uses LPDDR4X RAM technology and supports up to 3GB memory and 32GB ROM Storage eMMC 5.1 technology, USB-C 2.0 fast 15W charging, li-po 7040mAh capacity battery. with powerful mid-range Snapdragon processor 662 8-core @2.0Ghz and Adreno 610 GPU. 4 stereo speakers, supports 3.5mm audio jack port.SM-T500(Wi-FI only) and SM-T505 (LTE)version.
 Li-Po 7040 mAh battery
 IPS 10.4" 1200x2000 pixels resolution
 Snapdragon 662 11nm 8-cores @2.0Ghz processor
 3GB of RAM LPDDRX4 & 32GB ROM storage eMMC5.1 version
 Adreno 610 GPU
 Main camera 8MP@1080p & Selfie Camera 5MP&1080p
 microSD up to 1TB external storage
 USB-C 2.0 version with 15W fast charging
 4X Stereo speakers + 3.5mm audio jack

Samsung Galaxy Tab A7 Lite
The lighter variant has an  screen size, 5100 mAh battery, with an 8 MP AF camera, a 2 MP FF camera. It uses the MediaTek Helio P22T chipset and a PowerVR GE8320 graphics chip.

References

A7
Tablet computers introduced in 2020